This article provides details of international football games played by the Netherlands national football team from 2020 to present.

Matches

Results

2020

2021

2022

Fixtures

2023

Notes

References

External links

Netherlands national football team results
2020s in the Netherlands